Celebration Day is a concert film and live album by the English rock band Led Zeppelin, recorded at the Ahmet Ertegun Tribute Concert on 10 December 2007, in The O Arena, London. The film was given a limited theatrical release starting on 17 October 2012, and was released on several home audio and video formats on 19 November 2012. The performance, the film, and album releases have been widely praised.

Recording and promotion

In 2007, a benefit concert to commemorate the life of music executive Ahmet Ertegun was staged with a reunited Led Zeppelin as the main act. They played many of their most famous songs to an enthusiastic crowd and coordinated a professional recording of the show with 16 cameras, with the prospect of a home video release. Rumours immediately circulated that the recording would become available, but the following year, band member Jimmy Page said that release wasn't certain and that it required mixing and would be a "massive job to embark on." Bassist John Paul Jones agreed that he would like to see it released commercially, but that there was no timeline. Even through 2010, Page was uncertain of the status of the album. On 9September 2012, the band updated its Facebook page, which led to widespread speculation that the release was finally ready. Details leaked over the following days, with theatre web sites announcing airings of the film slated for the following month.

On 13September, the band revealed that the film would hit theatres on 17October, with premieres in Berlin, London, Los Angeles, New York City, and Tokyo and that the home video was scheduled for 19 November. The surviving members of the band appeared at a press event on 21September to promote the release. They debuted the film at London's famed Hammersmith Apollo on October 12 (of 2012) and answered questions afterward; when queried about more reunion performances, the trio were coy.

Like the 2007 greatest hits album Mothership, the cover and promotional art were designed by Shepard Fairey. Alan Moulder worked with Jimmy Page on mixing the album but used only a minimal amount of overdubs and corrections, as both the performance itself and the recording were of high quality.

Release and reception
The album was released in a standard edition consisting of one DVD or Blu-ray bundled with two soundtrack CDs. A triple vinyl LP was initially announced to be released on 10December 2012 but distribution started in the middle of February 2013. The deluxe edition includes bonus video from the Shepperton rehearsals and news footage from the BBC. Additionally, there is an audio-only Blu-ray with DTS-HD MA 24-bit/48 kHz sound and no video.

Concert
The concert performance was well received. NME published that the show "prove[d] that they can still perform to the level that originally earned them their legendary reputation." Writing for The New Yorker, Sasha Frere-Jones opined, "the failed gigs of the nineteen-eighties and nineties have been supplanted by a triumph, and the band should be pleased to have done Ertegun proud with such a spirited performance."

Film
The film has also received acclaim from critics. Marc Lee of The Daily Telegraph gave it five out of five stars and concluded that "Celebration Day is a celebration of rock 'n' roll at its most moving, magical and magnificent." The initial screening opened to over 1,500 screens in 40 countries and grossed over USD$2 million, leading to further showings worldwide. In 2013, it won a Classic Rock Roll of Honours Award for Film of the Year.

Album

The album has received generally positive reviews from critics; it holds an 85% normalized score from review aggregator Metacritic, indicating "universal acclaim".

In terms of sales, it debuted on the Billboard 200 at No. 9. According to the International Federation of the Phonographic Industry (IFPI), Celebration Day was the 13th-best-selling album globally of 2012 with sales of 1.8 million copies.

The album won the Grammy Award for Best Rock Album at the 56th Annual Grammy Awards, and the rendition of "Kashmir" featured on the album was nominated for the award for Best Rock Performance.

Track listing
All songs administered by WB Music Corp. (ASCAP)

Video bonus features
Shepperton rehearsals
BBC footage

Personnel
Led Zeppelin
Jason Bonham – drums, percussion; backing vocals on "Good Times Bad Times" and "Misty Mountain Hop"
John Paul Jones – bass guitar, Korg OASYS, Korg X50
Jimmy Page – guitar, theremin, production
Robert Plant – vocals; harmonica on "Nobody's Fault But Mine", tambourine on "In My Time of Dying" and "Stairway to Heaven"

Additional personnel
Big Mick – live sound mixing
Roy Williams – live vocals mixing
Dick Carruthers – direction
John Davis – mastering
Alan Moulder – audio mixing (recorded music)
Victor Riva – special effects

Certifications

See also

Live Aid (1985) – Led Zeppelin's first reunion
Atlantic Records 40th Anniversary (1988) – Led Zeppelin's second reunion

References

External links

Led Zeppelin's homepage on the reunion show
The O Arena's site promoting the gig

Press release announcing the film

2012 films
2012 live albums
2012 video albums
Albums produced by Jimmy Page
Atlantic Records live albums
Atlantic Records video albums
Charity albums
Concert films
English films
Films set in 2007
Films set in London
Films shot in London
Led Zeppelin live albums
Led Zeppelin video albums
Swan Song Records live albums
Swan Song Records video albums
Albums with cover art by Shepard Fairey
Grammy Award for Best Rock Album
2010s English-language films